The Thanh Trì Bridge (completed 2008) is a bridge across the Red River in Hanoi, Vietnam. It was one of the Millennial Anniversary of Hanoi commemorative projects along with the Vĩnh Tuy Bridge. At 3,084m it is one of the longest bridges in Asia. It is part of the Hanoi Third Ring Road, and is the largest prestressed concrete bridge in Vietnam.

References

 

Bridges in Hanoi
Hong River
Millennial Anniversary of Hanoi
Bridges completed in 2010
2010 establishments in  Vietnam
21st century in Hanoi